Colorado Springs Switchbacks FC is a professional soccer team based in Colorado Springs, Colorado. Founded in 2014, the team is a member of the USL Championship, the second tier of the American soccer pyramid. The franchise is owned by Martin E. Ragain and Dean Weidner. The franchise is operated by the Ragain family.

History
The Ragain Family was awarded a USL Pro franchise on December 5, 2013, with plans to begin play in 2015. The team's name, the "Switchbacks", was announced on January 31, 2014, following a fan contest. The team hired Steve Trittschuh as head coach on March 11, 2014.  Luke Vercollone was the first player signed by Colorado Springs in October 2014. The Ragain Family chose Colorado Springs in large part because of the City for Champions vision by city leaders which included a downtown stadium concept that needed a champion of its own.

Steve Trittschuh and Luke Vercollone lead Colorado Springs to two immediate post season appearances in 2015 and 2016. A talented 2017 roster did not qualify for the playoffs followed by increasingly challenging league competitions through 2020 as the USL Championship grew.

In July 2019, the Switchbacks and Trittschuh parted ways naming Assistant Coach Wolde Harris the interim Head Coach. On September 23, Switchbacks announced the selection of Alan Koch as the next Head Coach. Koch's leadership of the team was cut short by Covid 19 and a restructuring of the 2020 season thereafter returning to Canada. A stabilizing limited affiliation between the Switchbacks and Colorado Rapids between 2019 and 2021 provided the club with additional technical resources and staff including Brian Crookham that aided the transitioning club.

The Switchbacks next looked to Brendan Burke from the Philadelphia Union as Head Coach to lead the club in its transition downtown beginning a new phase for the franchise. Switchbacks rebranded by simplifying the original logo and colors. Burke quickly went to work restructuring the team making a 2021 playoff appearance in his first season. Player Hadji Barry tied the Championship league record for total goals scored at 25 goals earning the leagues Golden Boot award. 2022 saw the best start in franchise history both on and off the field tying the league record with 5 wins before defeat.

Stadium
The team opened Weidner Field (Perkins & Will Architects), a new 8,000-seat downtown stadium, for the 2021 season. Plans for the stadium were officially announced by the City of Colorado Springs in July 2018. Construction began on December 7, 2019. The stadium cost was $47 million and funded by team ownership and Regional Tourism Act / City for Champions tax increment financing. On October 15, 2020, the name "Weidner Field" was officially transferred from the team's old stadium in eastern Colorado Springs to the new downtown venue.

In 2014, Sand Creek Stadium (now officially known as Martin E Ragain Field) received a $3.5 million renovation by Martin E Ragain (Populous architects) after signing a 10-year lease with the City of Colorado Springs to meet league minimum stadium criteria for franchises. Located at roughly 6,500 feet above sea level, the stadium was at the highest elevation of any primary home stadium for a professional team in the American soccer pyramid. This status will transfer to the new Weidner Field, although it sits at a lower altitude of 6,035 feet.

Year-by-year

Current roster

Staff
  Martin Ragain – owner
  Nick Ragain – president
  Stephen Hogan – head coach
  James Chambers – assistant coach
  Alan McCann – performance & technical analyst

References

External links

 
Articles with hCards
2013 establishments in Colorado
Association football clubs established in 2013
S
Sports in Colorado Springs, Colorado
USL Championship teams